Caecina is a genus in the subfamily Ectrichodiinae of Reduviidae (assassin bugs); 16 species have been described, all of them are located in Eastern Asia.

Species
 Caecina cognata Miller, 1955
 Caecina consimilis Miller, 1941
 Caecina intrepida Miller, 1941
 Caecina javana (Breddin, 1903)
 Caecina javanica Maldonado, 1948
 Caecina montana Miller, 1953
 Caecina nubila Miller, 1954
 Caecina sinica Cui, 2008 
 Caecina spinulosa Stål, 1863
 Caecina sumatrensis Miller, 1941
 Caecina venatrix Miller, 1948
 Caecina venosa Miller, 1954
 Caecina walshae Miller, 1958

References

Cimicomorpha genera
Reduviidae
Fauna of East Asia